Lin Man-chiu is a Taiwanese writer of children's literature.

Awards
Lin has won numerous awards for her books, including:
 2014 - her novel The Ventriloquist’s Daughter,  was long-listed for the 2014 Found in Translation Award and subsequently selected for the Found in Translation Anthology
 2010 - “Good Books Everyone Can Read” Award for the best children's book of 2010
 2003 - Golden Tripod Award for children’s fiction - for 《尋找尼可西》[Looking for Nixi]

Selected publications
[The translated titles are approximate]
 《腹语师的女儿》 - The Ventriloquist's Daughter, translated into English by Helen Wang (Balestier Press, 2017)
 《戴帽子的女孩》 - The Girl in the Hat (a picture book using the paintings of Tan Ting-pho 陳澄波 (1895-1947), a Taiwanese artist killed while attempting to resolve conflict during the February 28 Incident)
 《古书里的宝藏》 - Treasures in Old Books, illustrated by Chen Weiping 陈卫平
 《尋找尼可西》[Looking for Nixi] 
  Siraya Boy, illustrated by Zhang You-Ran, translated by Michael Heckfield (Children's publications Co., 2008)

References

External links
Lin Man-Chiu on Writing Chinese project website
Lin Man-Chiu on Paper Republic
Lin Man-Chiu on Worldcat

Living people
Taiwanese children's writers
Year of birth missing (living people)
21st-century Taiwanese writers
21st-century Taiwanese women writers
Place of birth missing (living people)